Mayestan-e Bala (also Romanized as Māyestān-e Bālā; also known as Māyestān-e ‘Olyā) is a village in Siyarastaq Yeylaq Rural District, Rahimabad District, Rudsar County, Gilan Province, Iran. At the 2006 census, its population was 35, in 11 families.

References 

Populated places in Rudsar County